Merciful anosmia is a condition in which the person is unaware of a foul smell emanating from his own nose.  This condition is seen in atrophic rhinitis. In atrophic rhinitis, the turbinates, venous sinusoids, seromucinous glands and nerves undergo atrophy, resulting in a foul smelling discharge. As the nerve fibres sensing smell are also atrophied, the patient is unable to appreciate the foul smell.

References

Symptoms and signs: Respiratory system
Upper respiratory tract diseases